ECAC Hockey is one of the six conferences that compete in NCAA Division I ice hockey. The conference used to be affiliated with the Eastern College Athletic Conference, a consortium of over 300 colleges in the eastern United States. This relationship ended in 2004; however, the ECAC abbreviation was retained in the name of the hockey conference. ECAC Hockey is the only ice hockey conference with identical memberships in both its women's and men's divisions. Cornell has won the most ECAC men's hockey championships with 12, followed by Harvard at 11. Quinnipiac, which joined the league in 2005, already has 7 regular season championships.

History
ECAC Hockey was founded in 1961 as a loose association of college hockey teams in the Northeast. In June 1983, concerns that the Ivy League schools were potentially leaving the conference and disagreements over schedule length versus academics caused Boston University, Boston College, Providence, Northeastern and New Hampshire to decide to leave the ECAC to form what would become Hockey East, which began play in the 1984–85 season. By that fall, Maine also departed the ECAC for the new conference. This left the ECAC with twelve teams (Army, Brown, Clarkson, Colgate, Cornell, Dartmouth, Harvard, Princeton, RPI, St. Lawrence, Vermont, and Yale). Army would stay in the conference until the end of the 1990–91 season, at which point they became independent (they now play in Atlantic Hockey) and were replaced by Union College. Vermont left the ECAC for Hockey East at the end of the 2004–05 season, and were replaced in the conference by Quinnipiac.

The ECAC began sponsoring an invitational women's tournament in 1985. ECAC teams began playing an informal regular season schedule in the 1988–89 season, with the conference officially sponsoring women's hockey beginning in the 1993–94 season. ECAC teams won two of the three pre-NCAA American Women's College Hockey Alliance national championships, New Hampshire winning in 1998 and Harvard in 1999.

The ECAC was the only Division I men's hockey conference that neither gained nor lost members during the major conference realignment in 2011 and 2012 that followed the Big Ten Conference's announcement that it would launch a men's hockey league in the 2013–14 season.

Membership
There are 12 member schools in the ECAC. Since the 2006–07 season, all schools have participated with men's and women's teams, making ECAC Hockey the only Division I hockey conference with a full complement of teams for both sexes.

Ivy League Teams
Six Ivy League universities with Division I ice hockey programs are members of ECAC Hockey. Those schools are: Harvard, Dartmouth, Cornell, Yale, Princeton, and Brown University. Columbia University does not currently have a varsity intercollegiate ice hockey program. Penn supported an intercollegiate varsity hockey program in the past and was an ECAC Hockey member from 1966 to 1978 before the team was disbanded. The Ivy school that has the best record against other Ivy opponents in regular season ECAC games is crowned the Ivy League ice hockey champion. The Ivy League schools require their teams to play seasons that are about three weeks shorter than those of the other schools in the league. Thus, they enter the league schedule with fewer non-conference warm-up games. Harvard competes in the annual Beanpot Tournament.

Members

Membership timeline

Men's tournament sites

The ECAC Championship Game has been held at the following sites:
 1962–1966 — Boston Arena (now Matthews Arena), Boston
 1966–1992 — Boston Garden, Boston
 1993–2002 — Olympic Center (now Herb Brooks Arena), Lake Placid, New York
 2003–2010 — Times Union Center (Pepsi Arena through 2006), Albany, New York
 2011–2013 — Boardwalk Hall, Atlantic City, New Jersey
 2014–2019 — Herb Brooks Arena, Lake Placid, New York
 2020 - Canceled due to COVID-19 pandemic
 2021 - People's United Center, Hamden, Connecticut
 2022-2024 - Herb Brooks Arena, Lake Placid, New York

The winner of the game is awarded the Whitelaw Cup and receives an automatic bid to the NCAA Men's Division I Hockey Tournament.

Men's tournament champions

1962 St. Lawrence def. Clarkson 5–2

1963 Harvard def. Boston College 4–3 (ot)

1964 Providence def. St. Lawrence 3–1

1965 Boston College def. Brown 6–2

1966 Clarkson def. Cornell 6–2

1967 Cornell def. Boston University 4–3

1968 Cornell def. Boston College 6–3

1969 Cornell def. Harvard 4–2

1970 Cornell def. Clarkson 3–2

1971 Harvard def. Clarkson 7–4

1972 Boston University def. Cornell 4–1

1973 Cornell def. Boston College 3–2

1974 Boston University def. Harvard 4–2

1975 Boston University def. Harvard 7–3

1976 Boston University def. Brown 9–2

1977 Boston University def. New Hampshire 8–6

1978 Boston College def. Providence 4–2

1979 New Hampshire def. Dartmouth 3–2

1980 Cornell def. Dartmouth 5–1

1981 Providence def. Cornell 8–4

1982 Northeastern def. Harvard 5–2

1983 Harvard def. Providence 4–1

1984 Rensselaer def. Boston University 5–2

1985 Rensselaer def. Harvard 3–1

1986 Cornell def. Clarkson 3–2 (ot)

1987 Harvard def. St. Lawrence 6–3

1988 St. Lawrence def. Clarkson 3–0

1989 St. Lawrence def. Vermont 4–1

1990 Colgate def. Rensselaer 5–4

1991 Clarkson def. St. Lawrence 5–4

1992 St. Lawrence def. Cornell 4–2

1993 Clarkson def. Brown 3–1

1994 Harvard def. Rensselaer 3–0

1995 Rensselaer def. Princeton 5–1

1996 Cornell def. Harvard 2–1

1997 Cornell def. Clarkson 2–1

1998 Princeton def. Clarkson 5–4 (2ot)

1999 Clarkson def. St. Lawrence 3–2

2000 St. Lawrence def. Rensselaer 2–0

2001 St. Lawrence def. Cornell 3–1

2002 Harvard def. Cornell 4–3 (2ot)

2003 Cornell def. Harvard 3–2 (ot)

2004 Harvard def. Clarkson 4–2

2005 Cornell def. Harvard 3–1

2006 Harvard def. Cornell 6–2

2007 Clarkson def. Quinnipiac 4–2

2008 Princeton def. Harvard 4–1

2009 Yale def. Cornell 5–0

2010 Cornell def. Union 3–0

2011 Yale def. Cornell 6–0

2012 Union def. Harvard 3–1

2013 Union def. Brown 3–1

2014 Union def. Colgate 4–2

2015 Harvard def. Colgate 4–2

2016 Quinnipiac def. Harvard 4–1

2017 Harvard def. Cornell 4–1

2018 Princeton def Clarkson 2–1

2019 Clarkson def Cornell 3–2 (ot)

2020 Tournament Canceled

2021 St. Lawrence def Quinnipiac 3–2 (ot)

2022 Harvard def Quinnipiac 3-2 (OT)

2023 Colgate def Harvard 3-2

Men's regular season champion
The Cleary Cup, named for former Harvard player and coach Bill Cleary since 2001, is awarded to the team with the best record in league games at the end of the regular–season. There is no tie–breaking procedure should two or more teams end the season with the same record and the trophy is shared. A tie breaking procedure is applied to determine the top seed in the ECAC conference tournament. The Cleary Cup winner is not given any special consideration in the NCAA tournament as the ECAC awards its automatic bid to the winner of the ECAC tournament.

1984–85 Rensselaer

1985–86 Harvard

1986–87 Harvard

1987–88 Harvard and St. Lawrence

1988–89 Harvard

1989–90 Colgate

1990–91 Clarkson

1991–92 Harvard

1992–93 Harvard

1993–94 Harvard

1994–95 Clarkson

1995–96 Vermont

1996–97 Clarkson

1997–98 Yale

1998–99 Clarkson

1999–00 St. Lawrence

2000–01 Clarkson

2001–02 Cornell

2002–03 Cornell

2003–04 Colgate

2004–05 Cornell

2005–06 Colgate and Dartmouth

2006–07 St. Lawrence

2007–08 Clarkson

2008–09 Yale

2009–10 Yale

2010–11 Union

2011–12 Union

2012–13 Quinnipiac

2013–14 Union

2014–15 Quinnipiac

2015–16 Quinnipiac

2016–17 Harvard and Union

2017–18 Cornell

2018–19 Cornell and Quinnipiac

2019–20 Cornell

2020–21 Quinnipiac

2021–22 Quinnipiac

2022–23 Quinnipiac

Women's ECAC championship games

1985 Providence def. New Hampshire
1986 New Hampshire def. Northeastern
1987 New Hampshire def. Northeastern
1988 Northeastern def. Providence
1989 Northeastern def. Providence
1990 New Hampshire def. Providence (in Durham, New Hampshire)
1991 New Hampshire def. Northeastern (Durham)
1992 Providence def. New Hampshire (in Providence, Rhode Island)
1993 Providence def. New Hampshire (in Boston)
1994 Providence def. Northeastern (Providence)
1995 Providence def. New Hampshire (Providence)
1996 New Hampshire def. Providence (Durham)
1997 Northeastern def. New Hampshire (Boston)
1998 Brown def. New Hampshire (Boston)
1999 Harvard def. New Hampshire (Providence)
2000 Brown def. Dartmouth (Providence)
2001 Dartmouth def. Harvard (in Hanover, New Hampshire)
2002 Brown def. Dartmouth (Hanover)
2003 Dartmouth def. Harvard (Providence)
2004 Harvard def. St. Lawrence (in Schenectady, New York)
2005 Harvard def. Dartmouth (Schenectady)
2006 Harvard def. Brown (in Canton, New York)
2007 Dartmouth def. St. Lawrence (Hanover)
2008 Harvard def. St. Lawrence (Boston)
2009 Dartmouth def. Rensselaer (Boston)
2010 Cornell def. Clarkson (in Ithaca, New York)
2011 Cornell def. Dartmouth (Ithaca)
2012 St. Lawrence def. Cornell (Ithaca)
2013 Cornell def. Harvard (Ithaca)
2014 Cornell def. Clarkson (in Potsdam, New York)
2015 Harvard def. Cornell (Potsdam)
2016 Quinnipiac def. Clarkson (Hamden, Connecticut)
2017 Clarkson def. Cornell (Potsdam)
2018 Clarkson def. Colgate (Potsdam)
2019 Clarkson def. Cornell (Ithaca)
2020 Princeton def. Cornell (Ithaca)
2021 Colgate def. St. Lawrence (Hamilton)
2022  Colgate def. Yale (New Haven)
2023  Colgate def. Clarkson (New Haven)

Men's Conference Records
Team's records against current conference opponents. (As of the end of the 2018-19 season.)

Harvard and Princeton both record a loss on January 4, 1941. The game was played in Princeton with the score either 5–3 Harvard or 6–2 Princeton.

Conference arenas

Awards

Men's
At the conclusion of each regular season schedule the coaches of each ECAC team vote which players they choose to be on the two to four All-Conference Teams: first team and second team (rookie team starting in 1987–88 and third team beginning in 2005–06). Additionally they vote to award up to 7 individual trophies to an eligible player at the same time. ECAC Hockey also awards a Conference Tournament Most Outstanding Player as well as an All-Tournament Team, which are voted on at the conclusion of the conference tournament. Three awards have been bestowed every year that ECAC has been in operation while the 'Best Defensive Defenseman' was retired from 1967–68 thru 1991–92
and the All-Tournament team was discontinued from 1973 thru 1988.

All-Conference Teams

Individual Awards

NCAA Records
 In 2000, St. Lawrence University won the second longest game in NCAA tournament history. St. Lawrence defeated Boston University in quadruple overtime by a score of 3–2. Currently, this game is the fifth longest game in NCAA division I history.
 On March 4, 2006, Union College played host to the longest NCAA men's ice hockey game in NCAA history. In Game 2 of the first round of the 2006 ECACHL Tournament (best of three series) between Yale University and Union, Yale won 3–2 1:35 into the 5th overtime. Overall, the game took 141:35 to decide the winner.
 On March 11, 2010, Quinnipiac defeated Union College 3–2. The game, which lasted 150 minutes and 22 seconds, set a new record for the longest hockey game in NCAA history. The record lasted until March 6, 2015 when a Hockey East playoff game between UMass and Notre Dame lasted just over a minute longer.
 Cornell University recorded the only undefeated and untied season for a Division I NCAA champion in 1970.

References

External links
ECAC Hockey home pages:
Men
Women
ECAC Hockey to Celebrate 50th Anniversary (September 8, 2010 press release). ECAC Hockey official website. Retrieved September 25, 2010.

 
Sports in Albany, New York
1961 establishments in the United States
Articles which contain graphical timelines
College ice hockey conferences in the United States